PSISra stands for Persatuan Sepakbola Indonesia Sragen (en: Football Association of Indonesia Sragen). PSISra Sragen is an Indonesian football club based in Sragen Regency, Central Java. Club played in Liga 3.

References

External links
PSISra Sragen Liga-Indonesia.co.id
 

Football clubs in Indonesia
Association football clubs established in 1980
1980 establishments in Indonesia
Football clubs in Central Java